Tashar may refer to:
 Tashar, Kermanshah (تشار - Tashār) in Iran
 Tashar, Ukhrul, a village in Manipur, India